Xyroptila monomotapa is a moth of the family Pterophoridae which is endemic to Mozambique.

References

External links

Moths described in 2006
Endemic fauna of Mozambique
Moths of Africa
monomotapa